Chebli (Arabic: الشبلي Shabli) is a town and commune in Blida Province, Algeria. According to the 1998 census it has a population of 21,506.

References

Communes of Blida Province